This is a list of listed buildings in the parish of Inverchaolain in Argyll and Bute, Scotland.

List 

|}

Key

See also 
 List of listed buildings in Argyll and Bute

Notes

References
 All entries, addresses and coordinates are based on data from Historic Scotland. This data falls under the Open Government Licence

Inverchaolain